Perrotia paroechus is a butterfly in the family Hesperiidae. It is found in central, eastern and north-eastern Madagascar. The habitat consists of forests.

References

Butterflies described in 1887
Erionotini
Butterflies of Africa
Taxa named by Paul Mabille